The Blenheim and Woodstock branch line was a  railway branch line that linked Kidlington and Woodstock, Oxfordshire. It ran from Kidlington railway station parallel with the Cherwell Valley Line north to Shipton-on-Cherwell, where it turned west through  towards .

History
Built for the 8th Duke of Marlborough, the line opened on 19 May 1890 and was privately owned until 1897 when it became part of the Great Western Railway, although the line was operated by Great Western Railway from its inception. In 1929  was opened, primarily to serve the Oxford and Shipton Cement Company limestone quarry and cement works. The last train ran on 27 February 1954 and track lifting was completed in January 1958.

Train services
The original service was four trains each way between Oxford and Blenheim and Woodstock. By around 1910, this had become ten trains a day and it remained at this level for many years. By 1938, the passenger service had been pruned back to nine trains a day, not all trains running through to Oxford. The number of trains serving the station was cut in the late 1930s, and again in 1952 down to only six trains a day. These cuts in the frequency of trains along the Woodstock branch line produced two-hour waits at Kidlington for a connection.

Closure
British Railways closed the branch line in March 1954 with the last train adorned with a wreath. The track was lifted in 1958.

References

Bibliography

External links
 The line on navigable 1947 O.S. map
 Photographs of the line and station sites today

Closed railway lines in South East England
Rail transport in Oxfordshire
Railway lines opened in 1874
Railway companies disestablished in 1897
Railway lines closed in 1952